The 2011–12 Hamburger SV season was the 124th season in the club's football history. In 2011–12 the club played in the Bundesliga, the top tier of German football. It was the club's 49th season in the Bundesliga, the only club to have played every season in the league since its introduction in 1963.

Competitions

Bundesliga

League table

Matches

DFB-Pokal

Squad and statistics

Squad

|}
Source:

Transfers

In

Out

Kits

References

External links
 2011–12 Hamburger SV season at Weltfussball.de 
 2011–12 Hamburger SV season at kicker.de 
 2011–12 Hamburger SV season at Fussballdaten.de 

Hamburger SV
Hamburger SV seasons